Gunslinger Girl is a manga series written and illustrated by Yu Aida. It first premiered in Japan on May 21, 2002 in the monthly Dengeki Daioh magazine and completed its run with the 100th chapter with the September 2012 issue. The chapters are also being published in collected volumes by ASCII Media Works, with the first volume released November 27, 2002. Fourteen volumes have been published in Japan as of December 11, 2011. The manga ended with the release of the 100th chapter. These final chapters were collected in a fifteenth volume released on December 17, 2012.

When ADV Manga was formed in 2003, the Gunslinger Girl manga series was one of the first titles the new branch of ADV Films licensed for an English language release in North America. The first volume was released on November 18, 2003, with the next two volumes not released until 2005. At the 2005 AnimeNEXT convention, the ADV representative David L. Williams said the slow schedule was due to ADV Manga feeling the market was too saturated with new manga titles at the time and that they had rushed into the manga market.  However, after the third volume was released that year, the series went on a two-year hiatus. The series was restarted in July 2007 with the publication of the fourth volume, and six volumes were released through April 2008. On April 8, 2010, manga publisher Seven Seas Entertainment announced that it has licensed Gunslinger Girl and will be re-released, with a new translation and in an omnibus format.

Volume list

|}

See also
 List of Gunslinger Girl characters
 List of Gunslinger Girl episodes

References

External links
  
 

Gunslinger Girl

ja:GUNSLINGER GIRL#単行本